Bhagavan, also spelt Bhagwan (sometimes translated in English as "Lord","God"), is an epithet within Indian religions used to denote figures of religious worship. In Hinduism it is used to signify a deity or an avatar, particularly for Krishna and Vishnu in Vaishnavism, Shiva in Shaivism and Durga or Adi Shakti in Shaktism. In Jainism the term refers to the Tirthankaras, particularly Mahavira, and in Buddhism to the Buddha.

In many parts of India and South Asia, Bhagavan represents the abstract concept of a universal God to Hindus who are spiritual and religious but do not worship a specific deity.

In bhakti school literature, the term is typically used for any deity to whom prayers are offered. A particular deity is often the devotee's one and only Bhagavan. The female equivalent of Bhagavān is Bhagavati. To some Hindus, the word Bhagavan is an abstract, genderless concept of God.

In Buddhism's Pali and Sanskrit scriptures, the term is used to denote Gautama Buddha, referring him as Bhagavā or Bhagavān (translated with the phrase "Lord" or "The Blessed One"). The term Bhagavan is also found in other Theravada, Mahayana and Tantra Buddhist texts.

Etymology and meaning
Bhagavān, nominative singular of the adjective Bhagavat, literally means "fortunate", "blessed" (from the noun , meaning "fortune", "wealth", cognate to Slavic  "god", Polish bogaty, Serbo-Croatian bogat, Russian  (bogatyj) "wealthy"), Turkish bey,  and hence "illustrious", "divine", "venerable", "holy", etc.

The Vishnu Purana defines Bhagavān as follows,

The same text defines Bhaga and provides the etymological roots as follows as translated by Wilson,

Bhagavan is related to the root Bhaj (भज्, "to revere", "adore"), and implies someone "glorious", "illustrious", "revered", "venerable", "divine", "holy" (an epithet applied to gods, holy or respectable personages). The root Bhaj also means "share with", "partake of", "aportion". Clooney and Stewart state that this root, in Vaishnava traditions, implies Bhagavan as one perfect creator that a devotee seeks to partake from, share his place with, by living in god, in the way of god, the loving participation between the two being its own reward.

Buddha is referred to as Bhagavan in ancient and medieval Theravada, Mahayana and Tantra Buddhist texts, where it connotes, "Lord", "Blessed One", "Fortunate One".

Hinduism

Literature
The Vedic texts neither mention nor provide a basis to explain the origin of the Bhagavān concept.

 Upanishads

The root of "Bhagavan", "Bhaga" is mentioned in the Mundaka Upanishad, but it does not mean or imply "Bhagavan"':

शौनको ह वै महाशालोऽङ्गिरसं विधिवदुपसन्नः पप्रच्छ ।
कस्मिन्नु भगवो विज्ञाते सर्वमिदं विज्ञातं भवतीति ॥ ३ ॥

 Shaunaka asked: Can knowledge of the world's reality be so complete that all the many things we see are understood in it?
 Can something so complete, excellent be found that knowing it, one knows everything?
– Mundaka Upanishad I.1.3 

The Mundaka Upanishad then answers this question in two parts over verses 1.1.4 through 3.2.11. These verses split knowledge into two sections: lower knowledge and higher knowledge. Lower knowledge includes Vedas, phonetics, grammar, etymology, meter, astronomy and ceremony rituals. The higher knowledge indicates, the Upanishad asserts, is Self-knowledge and realizing its oneness with Brahman—the one which cannot be seen, nor seized, which has no origin, no qualities, no hips, nor ears, no hands, nor feet, one that is the eternal, all-pervading, infinitesimal, imperishable. The word Bhagavan does not appear in the Mundaka Upanishad and other early or middle Upanishads.

Later and medieval era Upanishads mention Bhagavān. For example, the very first verse of the Kali-Saṇṭāraṇa Upaniṣhad uses the term, as follows,

Kali-Saṇṭāraṇa, a minor Upanishad, then proceeds to disclose, among other things, two Bhagavan names in the Hare Krishna mantra in verse 2. This verse is sung by International Society for Krishna Consciousness (ISKCON) devotees.

 Purana

In Bhagavata Dharma, it denotes Narayana Vasudeva's four vyuha formations. Ishvara or God is called Bhagavan and the person dedicated to Bhagavan is called a Bhagavata. The Bhagavata Purana (I.iii.28) identifies Krishna as Narayana, Vāsudeva, Vishnu and Hari—Bhagavan present in human form. Bhagavan is the complete revelation of the Divine; Brahman, the impersonal Absolute, is unqualified and therefore, never expressed. Paramatman is Bhagavan in relation to Prakṛti and the Jiva. The Yoga of Devotion implies that if a Bhagavata, the devotee of Bhagavan, seeks and longs for Bhagavan, then Bhagavan too seeks his devotee in equal measure.

 Bhagavad Gita

The term Bhagavan appears extensively in the Bhagavad Gita, as Krishna counsels Arjuna. For example,

Vaishnavism

The Bhāgavat traditions of Hinduism invoke Bhagavan in Narayan Upakheyam and in the Bhagavad Gita of Bhishma Parva of the Mahabharata. The devotion to Lord Vishnu (identified as Vasudeva in Mahabharata) is described as ten incarnations of Vishnu. It introduced the Chatur – vyuha concept and laid emphasis on the worship of five Vrisini-warriors, reached the peak of its popularity during the Gupta Period.

Significance
In Hinduism, the word, Bhagavān, indicates the Supreme Being or Absolute Truth conceived as a Personal God. This personal feature indicated by the word Bhagavān differentiates its usage from other similar terms such as Brahman, the "Supreme Spirit" or "spirit", and thus, in this usage, Bhagavan is analogous to the Christian concept of God the Father. In Vaisnavism, a devotee of Bhagvān Krishna is called a Bhāgavata.

The Bhagavata Purana (1.2.11) states the definition of Bhagavān to mean the supreme most being: The Learned Know the Absolute Truth call this non-dual substance Brahman, Paramatma or Bhagavan. Bhagavān used as a title of veneration is often directly used as Lord, as in Bhagavān Rama, Bhagavān Krishna, Bhagavān Shiva, etc. In Buddhism and Jainism, Gautama Buddha, Mahavira and other Tirthankaras, Buddhas and bodhisattvas are also venerated with this title. The feminine of Bhagavat is Bhagawatī and is an epithet of Durga and other goddesses. This title is also used by a number of contemporary spiritual teachers in India who claim to be Bhagavan or have realized impersonal Brahman.

Bhakti (devotion to God) consists of actions performed dedicated to the Paramatman, the individuated existence which has free-will and who is the final cause of the world; the Vedic Rishis describe the goals originated from God as Bhagavān, the Ananda aspect of God where God has manifested His personality is called Bhagavān when consciousness (pure self-awareness) aligns with those goals to cause the unified existence and commencement of works follow.

Buddhism

Literature

Bhagavān in Buddhist texts

In Pali Literature 
Bhagava is the Pali word used for Bhagavan. Some Buddhist texts, such as the Pali suttas, use the word Bhagavā for the Buddha, meaning "the fortunate one". The term Bhagavā has been used in Pali Anussati or recollections as one of the terms that describes the "Tathāgata" as one full of good qualities, as arahant, sammā-sambuddho and sugato (Dīgha Nikāya II.93).

Bhagavan is one of the nine qualities of the Buddha. In the Buddha Anussati, Bhagavan is defined the following way:

Thus is the Buddha, deserving homage, perfectly awakened, perfect in true knowledge and conduct, well gone to Nibbana, knower of the worlds, incomparable leader (lit. charioteer) of persons to be tamed, teacher of gods and humans, awakened one and Blessed One.

In Sanskrit Literature 
Several Tibetan Buddhist tantra texts use the word Bhagavān. For example, the Pradipoddyotana manuscript of Guhyasamāja tantra-Samdhivyakarana uses the word Bhagavān, which Alex Wayman translates as "Lord". The text, elsewhere refers to "Bhagavan Sarvatathagatakayavakcittadipatih", which John Campbell translates as "Lord, Master of the Vajras of Body, Speech, and Mind of all Buddhas." Elsewhere, it states,

Laṅkāvatāra Sūtra, a sutra of Mahāyāna Buddhism, for example, uses the word Bhagavān over three hundred times, which is either left untranslated by scholars, or translated as "Lord or Blessed One". The devotional meditational text Sukhavati Vyuhopadesa by Vasubandhu uses the term Bhagavān in its invocations.

Variants 
Other variants of the term Bhagavan, such Bhagavant and Bhagavata can also be found throughout Buddhist texts. For instance, it is used in the initial chant, which is recited before almost every Sutta chanting,NamoTassa Bhagavato Arahato Samma-sambuddhassa
I honour to that Bhagavan, who is Arhat and a fully-enlightened Buddha

Significance
The term Bhagavān is found in liturgical practices of Theravada Buddhism, where it is used as an epithet that means the "Blessed One". Examples of such usage is found in Sri Lanka's Bodhi Puja (or Atavisi Buddha Puja, Worship of the Twenty Eight Buddhas).

The word Bhagavan is the most common word for the Buddhist texts to refer to the Buddha. For example, almost every sutra in Buddhist canonical and commentarial texts starts with the line likeEvaṃ me suttaṃ – ekaṃ samayaṃ bhagavā sāvatthiyaṃ viharati jetavane anāthapiṇḍikassa ārāme. (Pali)

evaṃ mayā śrutam | ekasmin samaye bhagavān śrāvastyāṃ viharati sma jetavane'nāthapiṇḍadasyārāme. (Sanskrit)

Thus have I heard - Once the Bhagavan was dwelling in Savatthi, at the Anathpindaka's monastery in Jetavana. (English Translation)

Inscriptions

Greek
A word derived from Bhagavan is documented epigraphically from around 100 BCE, such as in the inscriptions of the Heliodorus pillar; in which Heliodorus, an Indo-Greek ambassador from Taxila to the court of a Shunga king, addresses himself as a Bhagvatena (devotee) of Vishnu. ("Heliodorena Bhagavata", Archaeological Survey of India, Annual Report (1908-1909)):

This Garuda-standard of Vasudeva (Vishnu), the God of Gods was erected here by the Bhagavatena (devotee) Heliodoros, the son of Dion, a man of Taxila, sent by the Great Greek (Yona) King Antialcidas, as ambassador to King Kasiputra Bhagabhadra, the Savior son of the princess from Benares, in the fourteenth year of his reign."

Buddhist vase
Sākamunisa bhagavato is recorded in the kharoshthi dedication of a vase placed in a Buddhist stupa by the Greek meridarch (civil governor of a province) named Theodorus:

"Theudorena meridarkhena pratithavida time sarira sakamunisa bhagavato bahu-Jana-stitiye":
 "The meridarch Theodorus has enshrined relics of Lord Shakyamuni, for the welfare of the mass of the people"
– (Swāt relic vase inscription of the Meridarkh Theodoros)

Brass pillars and stupas
James Prinsep identified several engravings and inscriptions on ancient Buddhist artifacts that include the word Bhagavan and related words. For example,

 Bhagawana-sarirahi Sri Tabachitrasa Khamaspada putrasa dana.
"(Casket) containing relics of Bhagwan, the gift of Sri Tabachitra, the son of Khamaspada
– The Tope of Manikyala

See also
 
 Acintya
 Bhagavad Gita
 Bhakti
 Ishvara
 Jnana
 Lord
 Narayana
 Om Tat Sat
 Para Brahman
 Svayam Bhagavan
 Turiya
 Yoga

Notes

References

Sources

Further reading
 Richard Gombrich, "A New Theravadin Liturgy," Journal of the Pali Text Society, 9 (1981), pages 47–73.

Epithets of Gautama Buddha
Hindu given names
Hindu philosophical concepts
Names of God in Hinduism
Vedanta